Bođani (Serbian Cyrillic: Бођани ) is a village located in the Bač municipality which is in the South Bačka District of Serbia. The village is situated in the Autonomous Province of Vojvodina. The population of Bođani numbering 1,113 people (2002 census), most of whom are ethnic Serbs.

Name
The name of the settlement in Serbian is plural.

Demographics

Ethnic groups (2002 census):
Serbs = 586
Croats = 172
Yugoslavs = 127
Hungarians = 50
Ukrainians = 46
Roma = 28
Slovaks = 17
others.

Historical population
1961: 2,533
1971: 1,879
1981: 1,559
1991: 1,323

Gallery

See also
Bođani monastery
List of places in Serbia
List of cities, towns and villages in Vojvodina

References

Slobodan Ćurčić, Broj stanovnika Vojvodine, Novi Sad, 1996.

Places in Bačka
Bač, Serbia
South Bačka District